This is a list of newspapers in American Samoa.

Daily and nondaily newspapers

 Samoa News – Pago Pago
 Samoa Observer – Savalalo and Vaitele

External links
 Online Newspapers: American Samoa Newspapers

Newspapers
Newspapers

American Samoa
American Samoa
American Samoa

Newspapers